The 2014 United States Senate election in Nebraska took place on November 4, 2014. Incumbent Republican Senator Mike Johanns did not run for re-election to a second term. Republican nominee Ben Sasse defeated Democratic nominee David Domina to succeed him.

Republican primary

Candidates

Declared 
 Sid Dinsdale, president of Pinnacle Bank
 Clifton Johnson, businessman
 Bart McLeay, attorney
 Shane Osborn, former treasurer of Nebraska
 Ben Sasse, president of Midland University

Declined 
 Patrick Borchers, former vice president of academic affairs of Creighton University and former dean of Creighton University School of Law
 Jon Bruning, Attorney General of Nebraska (running for governor)
 Mike Foley, Auditor of Public Accounts (running for Governor)
 Jeff Fortenberry, U.S. Representative
 Dave Heineman, Governor of Nebraska
 Charles Herbster, businessman
 Charlie Janssen, state senator (running for state auditor)
 Mike Johanns, incumbent U.S. Senator
 Bob Krist, state senator
 Pete Ricketts, former COO of TD Ameritrade and nominee for the U.S. Senate in 2006 (running for governor)
 Adrian Smith, U.S. Representative
 Don Stenberg, Treasurer of Nebraska, candidate for the U.S. Senate in 1996, 2006 and 2012 and nominee for the U.S. Senate in 2000
 Lee Terry, U.S. Representative

Endorsements

Polling 

 * Internal poll for Ben Sasse campaign
 ^ Internal poll for Shane Osborn campaign

Results

Democratic primary

Candidates

Declared 
 David Domina, trial attorney and candidate for Governor of Nebraska in 1986
 Larry Marvin, air force veteran and candidate for U.S. Senate in 2008 and 2012

Declined 
 Brad Ashford, state senator
 Chris Beutler, Mayor of Lincoln
 Annette Dubas, state senator
 Mike Fahey, former mayor of Omaha
 Chuck Hassebrook, former Regent of the University of Nebraska and candidate for the U.S. Senate in 2012 (running for governor)
 Bob Kerrey, former U.S. Senator and former governor of Nebraska
 Steve Lathrop, state senator
 Mike Meister, attorney, nominee for Attorney General of Nebraska in 2002 and nominee for governor in 2010
 Kim Robak, former lieutenant governor of Nebraska

Endorsements

Polling

Results

General election

Candidates 
 Ben Sasse (R), president of Midland University
 David Domina (D), trial attorney and candidate for governor in 1986
 Dan Buhrdorf (I), former educator and peace activist
 Jim Jenkins (I), rancher, restaurant owner and former chairman of the Nebraska Ethanol Board
 Todd Watson (I), businessman

Debates 
 Complete video of debate, September 14, 2014

Predictions

Polling

Results

By county 
From Secretary of State of Nebraska

See also 

 2014 Nebraska gubernatorial election
 2014 United States House of Representatives elections in Nebraska
 2014 United States Senate elections
 2014 United States elections

References

External links 
 U.S. Senate elections in Nebraska, 2014 at Ballotpedia
 Campaign contributions at OpenSecrets
 Nebraska U.S. Senate debate excerpts, OnTheIssues.org

2014
Nebraska
United States Senate